The Boston University Terriers represented Boston University in Women's Hockey East Association during the 2016–17 NCAA Division I women's ice hockey season.

Offseason
April 20:  Victoria Bach, Rebecca Leslie and Savannah Newton were invited to the Hockey Canada Strength and Conditioning camp.

Recruiting

Roster

2016-17 Terriers

Schedule

|-
!colspan=12 style="background:red;color:#FFFFFF"| Regular Season

 
 
 
 
 
 
 
 
 
 
 
 
 
 
 
 
 
 
 
 
 
 
 
 
 
 
 
 
 
 
 
 
|-
!colspan=12 style="background:red;color:#FFFFFF"| WHEA Tournament

Awards and honors

 Mary Parker was named the WHEA Player of the Month for November, 2016.
 Abby Cook (Defender) was named to the WHEA Pro Ambitions All-Rookie Team.
 Victoria Bach (Forward) was named to the WHEA First Team All-Stars.
 Victoria Hanson (Goaltender) was named to the WHEA First Team All-Stars.
 Mary Parker (Forward) was named to the WHEA Second Team All-Stars.

References

Boston University
Boston University Terriers women's ice hockey seasons